Aquel famoso Remington is a 1982 Mexican film. It was directed by Gustavo Alatriste.

External links
 

1982 films
Mexican Western (genre) films
1980s Spanish-language films
Films directed by Gustavo Alatriste
1980s Mexican films